GL Limited is an investment company listed on the Singapore Exchange. Founded as Brierley Investments in 1961, it was formerly listed on the Australian, London and New Zealand exchanges.

History
Brierley Investments was founded by Ron Brierley in 1961 and in 1985 listed on stock exchanges in Australia, England and New Zealand. It grew to become one of the biggest – and for a time most successful and glamorous – companies in the 1980s. At its peak about 150,000 New Zealanders were Brierley Investments shareholders.

In the 1980s Brierley Investments was a feared corporate raider in Australia and Britain, but the firm stumbled after the 1987 sharemarket crash, and Brierley was eventually deposed in a boardroom coup. In the 1990s the firm's investments were poor, it mismanaged its foreign-exchange risk, and its balance sheet suffered. In 1999 the firm moved its head office to Singapore and listed on the Singapore Exchange. In July 2002, BI was delisted from the Australian Securities Exchange.

In 2003, Brierley Investments was acquired by the Guoco Group and rebranded GuocoLeisure in November 2007. Due to a low volume of trading, GuocoLeisure's board decided to delist from the New Zealand Exchange in June 2014.

Investments
Air New Zealand (35%)
Fairfax Media (25%)
GLH Hotels
Guinness Peat Group
Industrial Equity Limited
James Hardie (29%)
Thistle Hotels (46%)
Union Company (100%)

References

Companies formerly listed on the Australian Securities Exchange
Companies formerly listed on the London Stock Exchange
Companies formerly listed on the Singapore Exchange
Companies listed on the New Zealand Exchange
Financial services companies established in 1961
Financial services companies of New Zealand
1961 establishments in New Zealand